Rousselle is a French surname. Notable people with the surname include:

Benny Rousselle (born 1951), American realtor and politician
Jean Rousselle (born 1953), Canadian politician
Maurice Rousselle (1895–1926), French World War I flying ace

French-language surnames